The 2015 Belarusian Premier League was the 25th season of top-tier football in Belarus. It began on 10 April 2015 and ended on 8 November 2015. BATE Borisov were the defending champions, having won their 11th league title last year, and secured a 12th.

Format
Following the league expansion from 12 to 14 clubs, the league format returned to a regular double-round robin tournament with no second phase. Only one lowest-placed team was relegated and replaced by three best teams of First League, to expand the top level to 16 teams for 2016.

Teams

Two best teams of 2014 First League (Granit Mikashevichi and Slavia Mozyr) were promoted to the league, which was expanded from 12 to 14 clubs.

The last-placed team of 2014 Premier League (Dnepr Mogilev) were relegated after they lost relegation/promotion playoffs against First League third-placed team Vitebsk (who were promoted to replace Dnepr).

League table

Results
Each team will play twice against every other team for a total of 26 matches.

Top goalscorers

Updated to games played on 8 November 2015 Source: football.by

See also
2015 Belarusian First League
2014–15 Belarusian Cup
2015–16 Belarusian Cup

References

External links
 Official site 

Belarusian Premier League seasons
1
Belarus
Belarus